Venezuela competed at the 1968 Summer Olympics in Mexico City, Mexico.  Francisco Rodríguez won the nation's first ever gold medal. 23 competitors, all men, took part in 17 events in 5 sports.

Medalists

Gold
 Francisco Rodríguez — Boxing, Men's light flyweight

Athletics

Boxing

Men's Light Flyweight (– 48 kg)
Francisco Rodríguez
 First Round — Bye
 Second Round — Defeated Rafael Carbonell (CUB), 5:0
 Quarterfinals — Defeated Khata Karunatarne (CEY), TKO-2
 Semifinals — Defeated Harlan Marbley (USA), 4:1
 Final — Defeated Jee Yong-Ju (KOR), 3:2

Fencing

Four fencers represented Venezuela in 1968.

Men's foil
 Freddy Salazar
 Silvio Fernández
 Félix Piñero

Men's team foil
 Silvio Fernández, Félix Piñero, Freddy Salazar, Luis García

Men's épée
 Silvio Fernández
 Félix Piñero

Sailing

Shooting

Five shooters represented Venezuela in 1968.

50 m pistol
 Edgar Espinoza

50 m rifle, three positions
 Juan Llabot

50 m rifle, prone
 Enrico Forcella
 Boris Loginow

Trap
 Ivo Orlandi

References

External links
Official Olympic Reports
International Olympic Committee results database

Nations at the 1968 Summer Olympics
1968
1968 in Venezuelan sport